Marie Ault (2 September 1870 – 9 May 1951) was a British character actress of stage and film.

Biography
Born as Mary Cragg, in  Wigan, Lancashire, (now Greater Manchester. England. Ault was a star in many British films of the silent era but is most remembered for her role as Daisy Bunting's mother in The Lodger: A Story of the London Fog (1927) directed by Alfred Hitchcock. Other notable film work includes the role of Rummy Mitchens in the film of Bernard Shaw's Major Barbara (1941).

She also had bit parts in films such as Jamaica Inn (1939) and Caesar and Cleopatra (1945).

On stage from 1891, her theatre work included the original production of Love on the Dole in 1935, as well as the 1941 film version.

She died in London, England on 9 May 1951.

Selected filmography

 Class and No Class (1921) - Liza Ann
 Wee MacGregor's Sweetheart (1922) - Miss Todd
 A Prince of Lovers (1922) - Nannie
 If Four Walls Told (1922) - Minor Role
 The Grass Orphan (1922) - Landlady
 Paddy the Next Best Thing (1923) - Mrs. Adair
 The Monkey's Paw (1923) - Mrs. White
 The Starlit Garden (1923) - Old Prue
 Woman to Woman (1923) - Henrietta
 The Colleen Bawn (1924) - Sheelah
 The Rat (1925) - Mere Colline
 The Prude's Fall (1925) - Mrs. Masters
 The Triumph of the Rat (1926) - Mère Colline / The Landlady
 The Lodger: A Story of the London Fog (1927) - The Landlady
 A Daughter in Revolt (1927) - Mrs. Dale
 Mademoiselle from Armentieres (1927) - Aunt
 Roses of Picardy (1927) - Baroness d'Archeville
 Madame Pompadour (1927) - Belotte
 Hindle Wakes (1927) - Mrs. Hawthorn
 The Rolling Road (1927) - Grannie
 The Silver Lining (1927) - Mrs. Hurst
 Dawn (1928) - Mme. Rappard
 Victory (1928) - Mother
 Virginia's Husband (1928) - Aunt Janet
 God's Clay (1928) - Hannah
 Yellow Stockings (1928) - Countess
 Life (1928) - Isidora
 Troublesome Wives (1928)
 Little Miss London (1929)
 The Alley Cat (1929) - Ma
 The Return of the Rat (1929) - Mère Colline
 Kitty (1929) - Sarah Greenwood
 Downstream (1929) - Martha Jaikes
 Third Time Lucky (1931) - Mrs. Midge
 The Speckled Band (1931) - Mrs. Hudson (uncredited)
 Contraband Love (1931) - Sarah Sterling
 Hobson's Choice (1931)
 Money for Speed (1933) - Ma
 Daughters of Today (1933) - Mrs. Tring
 Maid Happy (1933) - Miss Woods
 Their Night Out (1933) - Cook (uncredited)
 Little Fella (1933) - Mrs. Turner
 Song at Eventide (1934)
 Swinging the Lead (1934) - Mrs. Swid
 Windfall (1935) - Maggie Spooner
 Lend Me Your Wife (1935) - Aunt Jane
 Tropical Trouble (1936) - Nonnie
 Owd Bob (1938) - Mrs. Sanderson (uncredited)
 Jamaica Inn (1939) - Coach Passenger (uncredited)
 Freedom Radio (1941) - Woman Customer
 You Will Remember (1941) - Minor Role (uncredited)
 Major Barbara (1941) - Rummy Mitchens
 Love on the Dole (1941) - Mrs. Jike
 The Missing Million (1942) - Mrs. Tweedle
 We Dive at Dawn (1943) - Mrs. Metcalfe (uncredited)
 The Demi-Paradise (1943) - Mrs. Jones (uncredited)
 It Happened One Sunday (1944) - Madame
 Twilight Hour (1945) - Liz (uncredited)
 Blithe Spirit (1945) - Cook (uncredited)
 The Man from Morocco (1945) - Hotelière
 Waltz Time (1945) - Cenci's Maid
 Caesar and Cleopatra (1945) - Egyptian Lady (uncredited)
 They Knew Mr. Knight (1946) - Grandma Blake
 Wanted for Murder (1946) - Flower Seller (uncredited)
 I See a Dark Stranger (1946) - Mrs. O'Mara
 Carnival (1946) - Mrs. Dale
 Blanche Fury (1948) - Old Gypsy
 The Three Weird Sisters (1948) - Beattie
 No Room at the Inn (1948) - Vicar's Maid (uncredited)
 Madness of the Heart (1949) - Nun
 Cheer the Brave (1951) - Mother-in-Law (final film role)

References

External links
 
 

1870 births
1951 deaths
People from Wigan
English stage actresses
English film actresses
English silent film actresses
20th-century English actresses
Actresses from Lancashire